Conceptions of Library and Information Science (CoLIS) is a series of conferences about historical, empirical and theoretical perspectives in Library and Information Science.

CoLIS conferences
 CoLIS 1 1991 in Tampere, Finland 
 CoLIS 2 1996 in Copenhagen, Denmark  
 CoLIS 3 1999 in Dubrovnik, Croatia 
 CoLIS 4 2002 in Seattle, USA 
 CoLIS 5 2005 in Glasgow, Scotland 
 CoLIS 6 2007 in Borås, Sweden  
 CoLIS 7 June 2010 in London, at City University London.
 CoLIS 8 August 19–22, 2013 in Copenhagen, Denmark, at The Royal School of Library and Information Science.
 CoLIS 9 June 27–29, 2016 in Uppsala, Sweden, at Uppsala University.
 CoLIS 10 June 16–19, 2019 in Ljubljana, Slovenia, Faculty of Arts
 CoLIS 11 Maj 29-June 1, 2022 in Oslo, Norway, Oslo Metropolitan University.

References

Library science
Information science
International conferences